The 1897–98 season is the 24th season of competitive football by Rangers.

Overview
Rangers played a total of 25 competitive matches during the 1897–98 season. They finished third in the Scottish League Division One with a record of 13 wins from 18 matches.

The club won the Scottish Cup that season. A 2–0 victory of Kilmarnock on 26 March 1898 saw them win the trophy for the second time in two seasons.

Results
All results are written with Rangers' score first.

Scottish League Division One

Scottish Cup

Appearances

See also
 1897–98 in Scottish football
 1897–98 Scottish Cup

Rangers F.C. seasons
Ran